Michael, Mickey, or Mike Evans may refer to:

Sports
 Mike Evans (basketball) (born 1955), former NBA player and current coach
 Michael Evans (Australian footballer) (born 1992), Australian rules footballer
 Michael Evans (Dutch footballer) (born 1976), Dutch footballer
 Micky Evans (born 1946), English footballer
 Mickey Evans (footballer, born 1947), Welsh footballer
 Mickey Evans (footballer, born 1973), British footballer, played for Plymouth Argyle and Southampton
 Mike Ronay Evans (born 1959), American heavyweight boxer
 Michael Evans (boxer) (born 1977), American lightweight boxer
 J. Michael Evans (born 1957), Canadian Olympic rower; Goldman Sachs, Alibaba executive
 Michael Evans (water polo) (born 1960), American Olympic water polo player
 Mike Evans (wide receiver) (born 1993), American football wide receiver
 Mike Evans (offensive lineman) (born 1946), American football offensive lineman
 Michael Evans (cricketer) (1908–1974), English cricketer
 Mike Evans (defensive lineman) (born 1967), American football defensive lineman

Other people
 Michael Evans (actor) (1920–2007), original cast member of Gigi
 Michael Evans (photographer) (1944–2005), presidential photographer
 Michael Evans (bishop) (1951–2011), Roman Catholic bishop of East Anglia, England
 Michael H. Evans, CEO and co-founder of The Vines of Mendoza
 Mike Evans (actor) (1949–2006), American actor on The Jeffersons, co-creator of Good Times
 Mike Evans (author) (born 1947), Christian American political author
 Michael Evans (politician) (born 1975), member of the Mississippi House of Representatives

Fictional characters
 Michael Evans, a fictional character on the sitcom Good Times
 Mike Evans, a character in the 2012 film Snow Shark
 Mike Evans, the co-founder of the Earth-Trisolaris Organization in the Three-Body science fiction trilogy